René Guillemin (born 1898, date of death unknown) was a French cyclist. He competed in the team pursuit at the 1924 Summer Olympics.

References

External links
 

1898 births
Year of death missing
French male cyclists
Olympic cyclists of France
Cyclists at the 1924 Summer Olympics
Place of birth missing